First Stories is the debut album by pianist Josh Nelson. It was released in 1998.

Track listing

Personnel
 Josh Nelson (listed as Joshua Nelson) - Piano 
 Karl Theobald - Saxophone
 Corey McCormick - Bass
 Nadir Jeevanjee - Drums
 Dino Meneghin - Guitar (on track 2 & 6)
 Reneé McCormick - Vocals (on track 4 & 7)

References

Josh Nelson albums
1998 debut albums
Instrumental albums